Goo goo may refer to:
 GooGoo Cluster
 Goo Goo Dolls
 Goo Goo Gaga
 Goo Goo Goliath

See also 
 Goo (disambiguation)
Gugu (disambiguation)